Anna Lang may refer to:

 Anna Lang (harpist) (1874–1920), Swedish harpist
 Anna Ruth Lang, recipient of the Canadian Cross of Valour